Cressdnaviricota is a phylum of viruses with small, circular single-stranded DNA genomes and encoding rolling circle replication-initiation proteins with the N-terminal HUH endonuclease and C-terminal superfamily 3 helicase domains.

Taxonomy
The following classes are recognized:

 Arfiviricetes
 Repensiviricetes

References

Viruses
Single-stranded DNA viruses